The Medal "In Commemoration of the 300th Anniversary of Saint Petersburg" is a state commemorative medal of the Russian Federation established on February 19, 2003, by Presidential Decree No. 210 to denote the 300th anniversary of the foundation of the city of St Petersburg, known as Leningrad during the Soviet Era.

Medal statute 
The Medal "In Commemoration of the 300th Anniversary of Saint Petersburg" is awarded to participants of the wartime defence of Leningrad, persons awarded a medal for the defence of Leningrad; residents who were blockaded in Leningrad; wartime workers who worked during the Great Patriotic War of 1941–1945 years in Leningrad and who were awarded state awards; citizens who were previously awarded the Medal "In Commemoration of the 250th Anniversary of Leningrad"; citizens who have made a significant contribution to the development of the city of St. Petersburg.

Presidential Decree 1099 of September 7, 2010 removed the Medal "In Commemoration of the 300th Anniversary of Saint Petersburg" from the list of state awards of the Russian Federation.  It is no longer awarded.

Medal description 
The Medal "In Commemoration of the 300th Anniversary of Saint Petersburg" is a 32mm in diameter circular brass medal.  Its obverse bears the left profile portrait of tsar Peter the Great crowned with a laurel wreath. Along the circumference of the medal, the inscription in relief "In commemoration of the 300th anniversary of St. Petersburg".  The medal reverse bears the central motif of the coat of arms of the city of St Petersburg, a vertically raised sceptre superimposed on two crossed anchors - sea and river.  On the left of the reverse, the relief inscription "1703", on the right, "2003".

The medal is suspended by a ring through the award's suspension loop to a standard Russian pentagonal mount covered with an overlapping 24mm wide red silk moiré ribbon with 1mm white edge stripes, in the center, an 8mm green stripe with a central 1mm black stripe.

Notable recipients (partial list)
The individuals listed below are recipients of the Medal "In Commemoration of the 300th Anniversary of Saint Petersburg".

 Prince of Russia Dimitri Romanovich Romanov
 Former President of France Jacques René Chirac
 President of Kazakhstan Nursultan Abishuly Nazarbayev
 Politician and political activist Vladimir Volfovich Zhirinovsky
 Cosmonaut Sergei Konstantinovich Krikalev
 President of Chechnya Ramzan Akhmadovich Kadyrov
 Marshal of the Soviet Union Dmitry Timofeyevich Yazov
 President of Tatarstan Rustam Nurgaliyevich Minnikhanov
 Former Mayor of Moscow Yury Mikhaylovich Luzhkov
 Conductor and opera company director Valery Abisalovich Gergiev
 Army General, former Minister of Emergency Situations Sergey Kuzhugetovich Shoygu
 Former Interior Minister of Russia Vladimir Borisovich Rushailo
 Archbishop Tadevuš Kandrusievič
 Former President of the Chuvash Republic Nikolay Vasilyevich Fyodorov
 President of the Udmurt Republic Alexander Alexandrovich Volkov
 Former Minister of the Internal Affairs of Russia General Rashid Gumarovich Nurgaliyev
 Governor of the Kurgan Oblast Oleg Alexeyevich Bogomolov
 Actor and singer Mikhail Sergeevich Boyarsky
 Politician and former Governor of Saint Petersburg Valentina Ivanovna Matviyenko
 Governor of Leningrad Oblast Valery Pavlovich Serdyukov
 Politician and journalist Alexander Evseevich Khinshtein
 Geologist and politician Marina Yevgenyevna Salye
 Lawyer and politician Nikolay Alexandrovich Vinnichenko

See also 

 Awards and decorations of the Russian Federation
 City of St Petersburg
 Siege of Leningrad
 Orders, decorations, and medals of the Soviet Union

References

External links

 The Commission on State Awards to the President of the Russian Federation
 The Russian Gazette  In Russian

Civil awards and decorations of Russia
Russian awards
Awards established in 2003
Tricentennial anniversaries